Ralph Edward Anderson (April 3, 1949 – December 20, 2016) was a professional American football defensive back in the National Football League (NFL).

After attending West Texas State (later renamed West Texas A&M), Anderson was drafted in the 5th round of the 1971 NFL Draft by the Pittsburgh Steelers.  He played for the Steelers for two years, starting 21 games at free safety and recording four interceptions.

In 1973, he moved on to the New England Patriots where he played a final season.

References

External links
NFL.com profile

Players of American football from Dallas
American football defensive backs
Pittsburgh Steelers players
New England Patriots players
West Texas A&M Buffaloes football players
1949 births
Living people